The canton of Aubagne is an administrative division of the Bouches-du-Rhône department, in southeastern France. It was created at the French canton reorganisation which came into effect in March 2015. Its seat is in Aubagne.

It consists of the following communes: 
Aubagne 
La Penne-sur-Huveaune
Roquevaire

References

Cantons of Bouches-du-Rhône